Ramnagar, Nepal  is a town and market place in Gaushala Municipality in Mahottari District in the Janakpur Zone of south-eastern Nepal. The municipality was established on 18 May 2014 by merging existing Nigauli, Ramnagar, Gaushala VDCs. At the time of the 1991 Nepal census it had a population of 5163 people residing in 952 individual households.

References

External links
UN map of the municipalities of Mahottari District

Populated places in Mahottari District